Martin Lipčák  (born 22 December 1975) is a Slovak footballer who plays as a goalkeeper for FK Haniska.

He has spent a large part of his career playing in the top tier of Slovak football, making over 200 appearances in the Corgoň Liga.

Career
Born in Sečovce, a town close to Košice, he debuted in the first division playing for 1. FC Košice. He moved to Dukla Trenčín in his early 20s playing out 3 seasons before making a switch to Artmedia Petržalka. He spent  seasons here winning the Slovak Cup in 2004 and helping them to win the league in 2005 although he left the club before the end of the season. After a successful stay in Bratislava he moved to another first division club, Spartak Trnava. The team were runners-up in the Slovak Cup in 2006.

Leaving Spartak Trnava halfway through the 2006–07 season he looked to play abroad and had trials at Skoda Xanthi and AEK Larnaca where a deal with the Cypriot side was close to being sealed but fell through after a failure to agree terms. A few weeks after he got his wish of playing outside of Slovakia by completing a switch to Hungarian 1st division outfit Zalaegerszegi. After a short six-month spell he returned to Slovakia joining 4th division side FK Neded where he spent the autumn of 2007 before leaving Slovakia for the second time to join aspiring Czech 2. Liga outfit Fotbal Třinec.

International
He was part of the Slovakian side at the Olympic Tournament in Sydney in 2000.

Honours
Artmedia Petržalka
 Slovak Cup: 2003–04

External links
Olympic athletes

1975 births
Living people
Slovak footballers
Association football goalkeepers
FC VSS Košice players
AC Sparta Prague players
AS Trenčín players
FC Petržalka players
FC Spartak Trnava players
Zalaegerszegi TE players
Footballers at the 2000 Summer Olympics
Olympic footballers of Slovakia
Slovak people of Czech descent
People from Sečovce
Sportspeople from the Košice Region